Sotho or Sesotho  Southern Sotho is a Southern Bantu language of the Sotho–Tswana ("S.30") group, spoken in Lesotho, where it is the national and official language; South Africa (particularly in the Vaal and the Free State), where it is one of the 11 official languages; and in Zimbabwe where it is one of 16 official languages.

Like all Bantu languages, Sesotho is an agglutinative language, which uses numerous affixes and derivational and inflexional rules to build complete words.

Classification
Sotho is a Southern Bantu language, belonging to the Niger–Congo language family within the Sotho-Tswana branch of Zone S (S.30).

Although Southern Sotho shares the name Sotho with Northern Sotho, the two groups have less in common with each other than they have with Setswana.

"Sotho" is also the name given to the entire Sotho-Tswana group, in which case Sesotho proper is called "Southern Sotho". Within the Sotho-Tswana group, Southern Sotho is most closely related to Lozi (Silozi), with which it forms the Sesotho-Lozi group within Sotho-Tswana.

The Northern Sotho group is geographical, and includes a number of dialects also closely related to Sotho-Lozi. Tswana is also known as "Western Sesotho".

The Sotho-Tswana group is in turn closely related to the other Southern Bantu languages, including the Venda, Tsonga, Tonga, Lozi which is native to Zambia and the other surrounding Southern African countries and Nguni languages, and possibly also the Makua (zone P) languages of Tanzania and Mozambique.

Sotho is the root word. Various prefixes may be added for specific derivations, such as Sesotho for the Sotho language and Basotho for the Sotho people. Use of Sesotho rather than Sotho for the language in English has seen increasing use since the 1980s, especially in South African English and in Lesotho.

Dialects

Except for faint lexical variation within Lesotho, and for marked lexical variation between the Lesotho/Free State variety and that of the large urban townships to the north (such as Soweto) due to heavy borrowing from neighbouring languages, there is no discernible dialect variation in this language.

However, one point that seems to often confuse authors who attempt to study the dialectology of Sesotho is the term Basotho, which can variously mean "Sotho–Tswana speakers," "Southern Sotho and Northern Sotho speakers," "Sesotho speakers," and "residents of Lesotho." The Nguni language Phuthi has been heavily influenced by Sesotho; its speakers have mixed Nguni and Sotho–Tswana ancestry. It seems that it is sometimes treated erroneously as a dialect of Sesotho called "Sephuthi." However, Phuthi is mutually unintelligible with standard Sesotho and thus cannot in any sense be termed a dialect of it. The occasional tendency to label all minor languages spoken in Lesotho as "dialects" of Sesotho is considered patronising, in addition to being linguistically inaccurate and in part serving a national myth that all citizens of Lesotho have Sesotho as their mother tongue.

Additionally, being derived from a language or dialect very closely related to modern Sesotho, the Zambian Sotho–Tswana language Lozi is also sometimes cited as a modern dialect of Sesotho named Serotse or Sekololo.

The oral history of the Basotho and Northern Sotho peoples (as contained in their liboko) states that 'Mathulare, a daughter of the chief of the Bafokeng nation (an old and respected people), was married to chief Tabane of the (Southern) Bakgatla (a branch of the Bahurutse, who are one of the most ancient of the Sotho–Tswana tribes), and bore the founders of five tribes: Bapedi (by Mopedi), Makgolokwe (by Kgetsi), Baphuthing (by Mophuthing, and later the Mzizi of Dlamini, connected with the present-day Ndebele), Batlokwa (by Kgwadi), and Basia (by Mosia). These were the first peoples to be called "Basotho", before many of their descendants and other peoples came together to form Moshoeshoe I's nation in the early 19th century. The situation is even further complicated by various historical factors, such as members of parent clans joining their descendants or various clans calling themselves by the same names (because they honour the same legendary ancestor or have the same totem).

An often repeated story is that when the modern Basotho nation was established by King Moshoeshoe I, his own "dialect" Sekwena was chosen over two other popular variations Setlokwa and Setaung and that these two still exist as "dialects" of modern Sesotho. The inclusion of Setlokwa in this scenario is confusing, as the modern language named "Setlokwa" is a Northern Sesotho language spoken by descendants of the same Batlokwa whose attack on the young chief Moshoeshoe's settlement during Lifaqane (led by the famous widow Mmanthatisi) caused them to migrate to present-day Lesotho. On the other hand, Doke & Mofokeng claims that the tendency of many Sesotho speakers to say for example ke ronngwe  instead of ke romilwe  when forming the perfect of the passive of verbs ending in -ma  (as well as forming their perfects with -mme  instead of -mile ) is "a relic of the extinct Tlokwa dialect".

Geographic distribution

According to the South African National Census of 2011, there were almost four million first language Sesotho speakers recorded in South Africa – approximately eight per cent of the population. Most Sesotho speakers in South Africa reside in Free State and Gauteng. Sesotho is also the main language spoken by the people of Lesotho, where, according to 1993 data, it was spoken by about 1,493,000 people, or 85% of the population. The census fails to record other South Africans for whom Sesotho is a second or third language. Such speakers are found in all major residential areas of Metropolitan Municipalities – such as Johannesburg, and Tshwane – where multilingualism and polylectalism are very high.

Official status
Sesotho is one of the eleven official languages of South Africa, one of the two official languages of Lesotho and one of the sixteen official languages of Zimbabwe.

Derived languages
Sesotho is one of the many languages from which tsotsitaals are derived. Tsotsitaal is not a proper language, as it is primarily a unique vocabulary and a set of idioms but used with the grammar and inflexion rules of another language (usually Sesotho or Zulu). It is a part of the youth culture in most Southern Gauteng townships and is the primary language used in Kwaito music.

Phonology

The sound system of Sesotho is unusual in many respects. It has ejective consonants, click consonants, a uvular trill, a relatively large number of affricate consonants, no prenasalised consonants, and a rare form of vowel-height (alternatively, advanced tongue root) harmony. In total, the language contains some 39 consonantal and 9 vowel phonemes.

It also has a large number of complex sound transformations which often change the phones of words due to the influence of other (sometimes invisible) sounds.

Dialectical evidence shows that in the Sotho–Tswana languages  was originally pronounced as a retroflex flap  before the two close vowels.

Sesotho makes a three-way distinction between lightly ejective, aspirated and voiced stops in several places of articulation.

The standard Sesotho clicks tend to be substituted with dental clicks in regular speech.

Orthography

Grammar

The most striking properties of Sesotho grammar, and the most important properties which reveal it as a Bantu language, are its noun gender and concord systems. The grammatical gender system does not encode sex gender, and indeed, Bantu languages in general are not grammatically marked for gender.

Another well-known property of the Bantu languages is their agglutinative morphology. Additionally, they tend to lack any grammatical case systems, indicating noun roles almost exclusively through word order.

See also
 Sotho calendar
 Sotho people
 South African Translators' Institute

Notes

References

Sources

 Batibo, H. M., Moilwa, J., and Mosaka N. 1997. The historical implications of the linguistic relationship between Makua and Sotho languages. In PULA Journal of African Studies, vol. 11, no. 1 

 Doke, C. M., and Mofokeng, S. M. 1974. Textbook of Southern Sotho Grammar. Cape Town: Longman Southern Africa, 3rd. impression. .
 Ntaoleng, B. S. 2004. Sociolinguistic variation in spoken and written Sesotho: A case study of speech varieties in Qwaqwa. M.A. thesis. University of South Africa. 
 Tšiu, W. M. 2001. Basotho family odes (Diboko) and oral tradition. M.A. thesis. University of South Africa

External links

 Sesotho Online A gentle introduction to the Sesotho language and culture.
 Weblog on Sesotho
 Translate.org.za Project translating Free and Open Source Software into South African languages, including Sesotho.
 PanAfrican L10n page on Sesotho Information on the language and localisation.
 Sesotho language tutorial A beginner's language text, created for the US Peace Corps.
 the SeSotho book  Another book developed by a Peace Corps volunteer

Software
 Spell checker for OpenOffice.org and Mozilla, OpenOffice.org, Mozilla Firefox web-browser, and Mozilla Thunderbird email program in Sesotho.

 
Vowel-harmony languages
Subject–verb–object languages